Eshqabad (also Romanized as ‘Eshqābād and ’Eshq Ābād) is a village in Atrak Rural District, Maneh District, Maneh and Samalqan County, North Khorasan Province, Iran. At the 2006 census, its population was 862, in 220 families.

References 

Populated places in Maneh and Samalqan County